The High Arctic camel, from the mid-Pliocene epoch, is a fossil camel related to the fossil genus Paracamelus from which modern camels arose. It is also related to the extinct Ice Age Yukon giant camel. Collagen-containing fossils were found in 2006 near Strathcona Fiord on Ellesmere Island in Nunavut, Canada. The High Arctic camel lived at least 3.4 million years ago during a warmer period in a boreal-type forest environment.

Fossil discovery
The remains of a High Arctic camel were discovered over several field seasons (2006-2010) in the Strathcona Fiord area of Ellesmere Island, in the Canadian Arctic Archipelago, at about 78°N latitude. About 30 fragments were collected from the Fyles Leaf Bed site and assembled, forming part of a right tibia. The presence of a fibular notch at the distal end of the bone suggests the bone was from an artiodactyl hooved mammal (e.g. cows, deer, camels). Size estimates are consistent with camels, as they were the largest artiodactyls in North America at the time. This is the first evidence of camels in the High Arctic and a new taxon for the mammal assemblage of the Pliocene High Arctic.

Collagen fingerprinting
Collagen fingerprinting showed the fragmentary fossil remains were from a camel and involved comparison of the ancient collagen with that of 37 modern mammal species, as well as the Pleistocene-Aged giant Yukon camel (tentatively referred to the genus Paracamelus). The High Arctic camel was most similar to the one-humped Dromedary camel and the Yukon giant camel.

Age and paleoenvironment
The estimated age of the camel fossil was obtained using a terrestrial cosmogenic nuclide (TCN) burial dating technique, which was applied to quartz sand containing the fossils. These deposits are at least 3.4 million years old and equivalent in age to the mammal fossil record in the nearby Beaver Pond fossil site. The deposits hosting the camel remains correlate to the Beaufort Formation, which was emplaced prior the onset of extensive North American glaciation at ~2.6 Ma.

The results showed that the High Arctic camel was most similar to the one-humped Dromedary camel and the Yukon giant camel. Paleoenvironmental reconstruction shows that in the mid-Pliocene the camel would have been living in a landscape that supported a boreal-type forest, dominated by larch trees. At the time, global temperatures are estimated to have been 2 to 3 degrees warmer than today, whereas locally, in the Strathcona Fiord area, temperatures would have been 14 – 22 °C warmer. Means annual temperature would have been around freezing, with cold and snowy winters.

References

External links

Canadian Museum of Nature media site

Prehistoric camelids
Pliocene even-toed ungulates
Pleistocene even-toed ungulates
Pliocene first appearances
Pleistocene extinctions
Prehistoric mammals of North America
Arctic land animals
Extinct animals of Canada
Ellesmere Island
Undescribed vertebrate species